Hearty Paws 2 is a South Korean drama film directed by Lee Jung-chul. It was released in South Korea by Lotte Entertainment on July 21, 2010.

Cast
 Dal-i as Maeumi
 Sung Dong-il as Hyuk-pil
 Kim Jung-tae as Doo-pil
 Song Joong-ki as Dong-wook
 Hans Zhang  as Zaoming
 Wang Seok-hyeon as video store patron

References

External links 
 
 
 

2010 films
2010s Korean-language films
South Korean drama films
Films about dogs
Lotte Entertainment films
South Korean sequel films
2010 drama films
2010s South Korean films